This is a List of operas and operettas by the French composer Emmanuel Chabrier (1841–1894).

List

References
Notes

Sources

Operone page on Chabrier, accessed 31 March 2011

 
Lists of operas by composer
 
Lists of compositions by composer